Hans Olsen (21 January 1886 – 13 September 1976) was a Danish fencer. He competed in four events at the 1912 Summer Olympics.

References

External links
 

1886 births
1976 deaths
Danish male fencers
Olympic fencers of Denmark
Fencers at the 1912 Summer Olympics
People from Slagelse
Sportspeople from Region Zealand